Nanchang Changbei International Airport  is an airport serving Nanchang, the capital of Jiangxi province, China. Construction began in October 1996 and the airport went into operation on 10 September 1999, replacing Nanchang Xiangtang Airport. It was upgraded to an international airport and was greatly expanded in 2008–2011.

History
Nanchang Xiangtang Airport, a dual-use civil and military airport, served as Nanchang's main airport from 1957 to 1999. From 102 passengers in 1957, by 1996 Xiangtang served more than 800,000 passengers annually and could no longer accommodate more traffic. In 1996, construction began for Changbei Airport, originally designed to handle 2 million passengers annually. On 10 September 1999, Changbei Airport was opened and all commercial flights were transferred from Xiangtang, which reverted to sole military use.

In 2003, Capital Airport Holding took over the operation of Changbei Airport from the Jiangxi Provincial Government. In the same year, it handled more than 1 million annual passengers for the first time. In 2004, Changbei was upgraded to an international airport. Passenger volume grew exponentially in the 2000s, and the airport underwent major expansion in 2008. At its completion in 2011, Changbei Airport became a Class 4E international airport, capable of handling 12 million passengers per year.

However, the rapid expansion of China's high-speed railway network diverted much of the airport's passenger volume, and passenger growth at Changbei slowed to 6.3%, 3.4%, and 5% in 2014, 2015, and 2016, respectively. The governments of Nanchang city and Jiangxi province began subsidizing new flights in 2017 and passenger volume grew by 39% in that year and exceeded 10 million for the first time. By 2018, the airport hosts 46 airlines, which operate 127 routes connecting Nanchang with 68 cities. The third phase of expansion, which will connect the airport to Nanchang Metro and the Nanchang–Jiujiang high-speed railway, is under construction.

Airlines and destinations

Incidents 
 Part of the airport exterior roof collapsed during strong winds on 4 March 2018.

See also
List of airports in China

References

Airports in Jiangxi
Transport in Nanchang
Airports established in 1999
1999 establishments in China